Jimmy Wilson (possibly January 21, 1918, 1921 or 1923 – February 5, 1965 or February 24, 1966) was an American West Coast blues singer, best known for his 1953 hit "Tin Pan Alley".

Life and career
Details of Wilson's life are sketchy and uncertain.  He may have been born Jimmie Ned Wilson in Gibsland, Louisiana, in 1918, or (according to other sources) near Lake Charles, Louisiana a few years later.

Wilson was singing with a gospel quartet, the Pilgrim Travelers, in California, when Bob Geddins began recording him in Oakland in 1951, initially with his band Bob Geddins' Cavaliers. Further recordings were made under Wilson's own name, often accompanied by guitarist Lafayette Thomas. Some of the masters were purchased by Aladdin, and Wilson then recorded for Aladdin in 1952 before returning to record for Geddins' Big Town Records in 1953.  The first side released, "Tin Pan Alley", reached number 10 on the US Billboard R&B chart, and helped to establish Geddins as a major figure in West Coast blues.

Wilson continued to record for Big Town, and a few other labels, but failed to capitalize on the success of "Tin Pan Alley".   He returned to Louisiana, where he recorded for Goldband Records; his 1958 song "Please Accept My Love" was later recorded by B. B. King and Elton Anderson. His last recordings were for Duke Records in Houston, Texas in 1961.

Wilson developed alcoholism, and died in Dallas, Texas, either on February 5, 1965 or on February 24, 1966.

References

20th-century births
1966 deaths
Blues musicians from Louisiana
American blues singers
West Coast blues musicians
20th-century American singers
Singers from Louisiana